Albert Young may refer to:

 Albert Young (American football) (born 1985), football player for the Minnesota Vikings
 Albert Young (boxer) (1877–1940), American boxer
 Albert Young (footballer) (1917–2013), Welsh footballer
 Albert Young (poet), writer and poet

See also
Bert Young (disambiguation)